"Girlfriend Is Better" is a 1984 song by new wave band Talking Heads, from their fifth studio album Speaking in Tongues. The song's single version was a live version, recorded at Pantages Theatre, Hollywood, from the soundtrack of their 1984 concert film Stop Making Sense, named for a lyric from the song.

Rolling Stones David Fricke described the song: "On the surface, 'Girlfriend Is Better' is a brassy, straightforward bump number sparked by Byrne's animated bragging ... and by the kind of rapid, zizagging synth squeals so common on rap and funk records. But the edgy paranoia smoldering underneath ... is colorfully articulated by guitar and percussion figures that burble along in a fatback echo, sounding like a sink backing up."

Charts

References

Talking Heads songs
1984 singles
1983 songs
Songs written by David Byrne
Sire Records singles
Song recordings produced by David Byrne
Song recordings produced by Jerry Harrison
Live singles